Hans Looschen (23 June 1859, Berlin - 11 February 1923, Berlin) was a German landscape, portrait and genre painter. He also created some illustrations.

Life and work 
His father, Hermann Looschen (1838-1891), was a porcelain painter at the Royal Porcelain Factory, Berlin. After graduating from a gymnasium in Charlottenburg, he began studying at the Prussian Academy of Arts. His instructors there included Paul Thumann, Otto Knille, and Ernst Hildebrand. His first exhibition took place at the Academy in 1887.

In 1893, he began exhibiting regularly at the Große Berliner Kunstausstellung, and served a few terms as its President. He was awarded a small gold medal there in 1908, and a large gold emdal in 1912. From 1899 to 1901, his works were presented at the Berlin Secession.

In 1908, he was also named a Professor. Initially, he was a member of the Prussian State Art Commission. Later, he worked with the "Preußischen künstlerischen Sachverständigenkammer" (roughly: chamber of art experts). In 1913, he was elected to the Academy, and served in its Senate until his death. The following year, he participated in the Venice Biennale. In 1916, he created a sensation when he visited the Halbmondlager, near Zossen, to paint six prisoners of war from North Africa.

He died in Berlin, at the age of sixty-three, from a heart attack.

Selected paintings

References

Further reading 
 Stiftung Stadtmuseum Berlin, Dominik Bartmann (Ed.): Gemälde II. Verzeichnis des Bestandes vom Ende des 19. Jahrhunderts bis 1945. Berlin 2004, pg.142 
 Looschen, Hans, in: Detlef Lorenz: Reklamekunst um 1900. Künstlerlexikon für Sammelbilder. Berlin : Reimer, 2000 pg.133

External links 

 More works by Looschen @ ArtNet
 Illustrations by Hans Looschen, for the novella Memoirs of a Good-for-Nothing by Joseph von Eichendorff
 Illustrations by Hans Looschen, for the stories of Joseph von Eichendorff

1859 births
1923 deaths
19th-century German painters
19th-century German male artists
German genre painters
German illustrators
Prussian Academy of Arts alumni
Artists from Berlin
20th-century German painters
20th-century German male artists